The county of Perche was a medieval county lying between Normandy and Maine.

It was held by an independent line of counts until 1226. One of these, Geoffroy V, would have been a leader of the Fourth Crusade had he not died before the assembled forces could depart. The county then became a possession of the crown, which removed part of it to create the county of Alençon.

After 1325, both counties were generally held by a member or members of a cadet line of the House of Valois. Upon the death without children of the last Duke of Alençon in 1525, it returned to the crown, and was granted only sporadically thereafter.

Lords of Mortagne, lords of Nogent-le-Rotrou and viscounts of Châteaudun

The lords of Perche were originally titled lords of Mortagne-au-Perche, until Routrou III adopted the style of count of Perche in 1126, thus uniting the lordship of Mortagne-au-Perche, the viscountcy of Châteaudun and the lordship of Nogent-le-Rotrou in the countship of Perche and Montagne.

Lords of Mortagne

House of Rorgonid

 Hervé I, 941- 955
 Hervé II, 974–980, son of the previous

Here after, the title is merged with the viscount of Châteaudun and the lord of Nogent-le-Rotrou.

Lords of Nogent-le-Rotrou

House of Nogent-le-Rotrou

 Rotrou I, 960–996
 Fulcois, son of the previous and husband of Melisende, Viscountess of Châteaudun, daughter of Herve I

Here after, the title is merged with the viscount of Châteaudun and the lord of Mortagne-au-Perche

Viscounts of Châteaudun

House of Châteaudun

 ...

Lords and counts of Perche and Mortagne

House of Châteaudun

 Fulcuich, c. 1000
 Geoffroy I, d. bef. 1041 (viscount of Châteaudun, lord of Nogent-le-Rotrou and of Mortagne-au Perche)
 Hugh I, d. c. 1077–1080 (viscount of Châteaudun, lord of Nogent-le-Rotrou and of Mortagne-au Perche)
 Rotrou II, d. c. 1077–1080 (viscount of Châteaudun, lord of Nogent-le-Rotrou and of Mortagne-au Perche)

Here after, the title is separated in count of Perche and count of Mortagne.

Counts of Perche

House of Châteaudun

 Geoffroy II, d. 1100, a companion of William the Conqueror
 Rotrou III the Great, d. 1144 (also Count of Mortagne 1126–1144), married to Matilda (second wife) and Hawise of Salisbury, daughter of Walter of Salisbury (third wife)
 Rotrou IV, under the regency of his mother Hawise and her second husband Robert I of Dreux.  Married to Matilda  (d. 1184), daughter of Theobald IV.  Killed at Siege of Acre, 1191.
 Geoffroy III, d. 1202 (married Matilda of Saxony (1172-1209/10))
 Thomas, killed at the Battle of Lincoln, 1217
 William II, d. 1226 (Bishop of Châlons-sur-Marne)

Here after the county returned to the royal domain.

The title of count of Perche was granted anew by the king to members of the House of Maine and the House of Châteaudun.

 ...

House of Valois

 1325–1346 : Charles II of Alençon
 1346–1377 : Robert of Alençon
 1377–1404 : Peter II of Alençon
 1404–1415 : John I of Alençon
 1415–1474 : John II of Alençon

The county was confiscated by the crown between 1474 and 1478, but was then returned to the family.

 1478–1492 : René of Alençon
 1492–1525 : Charles IV of Alençon, son of, married Margareth of Navarre
 1525–1549 : Margareth of Navarre, widow of

After the death of Margareth of Navarre the fief went to the royal domain. Here after the title of duke of Perche was personally granted by the king from time to time.

Dukes of Perche

House of Valois

 Francis, duke of Perche (1566–1584)

House of Bourbon

 Louis, duke of Perche (1771–1814)

English title
 Thomas Montacute, 4th Earl of Salisbury was created Earl of Perche in 1419 as part of Henry V of England's policy of creating Norman titles for his noblemen.
 Thomas Beaufort, Count of Perche was created Count of Perche in December 1427, but the title was contested with John II of Alençon.
 Humphrey Stafford, 6th Earl of Stafford, 1st Duke of Buckingham was created count of Perche in 1431 by Henry VI of England as titular king of France.

References

 
 
Perche
People associated with Sandleford, Berkshire